Doron Lancet is an Israeli human geneticist. He is the Ralph D. and Lois R. Silver Professor of Human Genomics and head of the Crown Human Genome Center at the Weizmann Institute of Science. He is known for researching the genetic basis of olfaction, and for developing the human genetics database GeneCards.

Honors and awards
Lancet received the Israel Biochemical Society's Hestrin Prize (1986), the Association for Chemoreception Sciences' Takasago Award (1986), and the R.H. Wright Award in Olfactory Research (1998). He has been a member of the European Molecular Biology Organization since 1996.

References

External links
Faculty page

Israeli geneticists
Living people
Human geneticists
Academic staff of Weizmann Institute of Science
Members of the European Molecular Biology Organization
Hebrew University of Jerusalem alumni
Weizmann Institute of Science alumni
Year of birth missing (living people)